Carrie Brown may refer to:

 Carrie Brown (author) (born 1959), American novelist and professor
 Carrie Brown (murder victim) (1834–1891), murdered New York prostitute, once suggested as a murder victim of Jack the Ripper
 Carrie Brown, sports correspondent on Al Jazeera English
 "Carrie Brown", song from The Mountain (Steve Earle album)
 Carrie Budoff Brown, American journalist and news editor

See also
Kerry Brown (disambiguation)
Caroline Brown (disambiguation)
Carolyn Brown (disambiguation)
Kerrie Brown, set decorator